is a Japanese manga series written and illustrated by Hiroyuki Nishimori. It was serialized in Shogakukan's Weekly Shōnen Sunday from September 2010 to September 2012, with its chapters collected in nine tankōbon volumes.

Publication
Written and illustrated by Hiroyuki Nishimori, Kōtetsu no Hanappashira was serialized in Shogakukan's shōnen manga magazine Weekly Shōnen Sunday from 29 September 2010 to 12 September 2012. Shogakukan collected its chapters in nine tankōbon volumes, released from 18 March 2011 to 16 November 2012.

Volume list

Reception
Most of Kōtetsu no Hanappashiras volumes were featured on Oricon's weekly chart of the best-selling manga; volume 2 debuted #26 (41,565 copies sold); volume 3 debuted #28 (27,653 copies sold); volume 4 debuted #25 (42,154 copies sold); volume 5 debuted #16 (37,074 copies sold); volume 6 debuted #19 (36,863 copies sold); volume 9 debuted #29 (21,317 copies sold).

References

External links
 Kōtetsu no Hanappashira official website at Web Sunday 
 

Comedy anime and manga
School life in anime and manga
Shogakukan manga
Shōnen manga